Safa Kadal is a town in the Srinagar district of Jammu and Kashmir. Kadal means bridge in Kashmiri. Jehlum river flows under this bridge on which the name of this place is named. The bridge was constructed by Saif Khan during the reign of a famous mughal emperor, Aurangzeb(1658-1707).

Ram Mandir, Safakadal 
Ram Mandir at Safakadal in Srinagar in Jammu and Kashmir is currently in ruins. It was vandalised in 1990 and has remained as such. In January 2022 it was finalised that the building would be renovated.

References

 

Srinagar district